Child of Sorrow (subtitled The Ruins) is a 1956 Philippine crime drama-tragedy film written by Rolf Bayer and directed by Lamberto V. Avellana. Set in the slums of Manila, recovering from the aftermath of the Second World War, the story follows Cita, a prostitute with good intentions and Vic, a war hero who served in the Korean War under PEFTOK, living together in the ravaged capital but when they were involved with Cardo's nasty plans, they, along with Father Fidel, join forces to stop him to succeed.

It was theatrically released by LVN Pictures on March 20, 1956, but it did not do well at the box office despite the failure, it became Avellana's cinematic masterpieces and one of the greatest Filipino films ever made due to its acclaim at the awards and positive reviews and given importance by film critics and scholars in modern times. The film was selected as the Philippine entry for the Best Foreign Language Film at the 29th Academy Awards, but was not accepted as a nominee. The film won the Golden Harvest for Best Film Award at the Asia-Pacific Film Festival in British Hong Kong.

Cast
Rosa Rosal as Cita
Tony Santos, Sr. as Vic
Joseph de Cordova as Kardo 
Vic Silayan as Father Fidel
Vic Bacani as Ipe
Leroy Salvador as Soldier
Rosa Aguirre as Tinay
Oscar Keesee as Club Manager (as Oscar Keese)
Alfonso Carvajal as Customs Officer
Johnny Reyes as Army Doctor
Eddie Rodriguez as Eddie
Arturo Moran as Gerry

Production
Unlike most LVN productions of the time, Anak Dalita didn't contain a single singing or dancing performance because of its theme—poverty and crime in post-war Manila—and because the lead stars of the film were minor box-office actors. The project was almost rejected by LVN Pictures founder and executive producer Narcisa de Leon, widely known as Doña Sisang, due to the said circumstances. Fortunately, her son, producer Manuel de Leon, believed strongly in the screenplay and convinced his mother to approve the project.

Locations
The film was shot in Intramuros. According to the recollections of the director's daughter Ivi Avellana Cosio, her father Lamberto used the existing locations as the setting of the film. For the part of the wooden houses, he and his team asked permission from the residents and house owners to use their residences as the setting for the characters, with the residents moving into nearby houses for the duration of the filming.

Restoration
The film was digitally scanned and restored by the ABS-CBN Film Restoration Project. The 2K digital scanned and restored version was first premiered online on October 31, 2020, as a special screening for the Pista ng Pelikulang Pilipino exhibition.

On March 31, 2021, on the eve of Holy Week, the 2K version of the film was live-streamed on ABS-CBN Film Restoration's Facebook page.

Accolades

References

External links

1956 films
1956 crime drama films
Films directed by Lamberto V. Avellana
Philippine crime drama films
Tagalog-language films
Squatting in film
Philippine black-and-white films